Geoffray Toyes (born 18 May 1973 in Bordeaux) is a French former professional footballer who played as a defender.

He represented the France national team at the 1996 Summer Olympics.

References

External links
 

Living people
1973 births
Footballers from Bordeaux
Association football defenders
French footballers
AS Nancy Lorraine players
FC Girondins de Bordeaux players
FC Metz players
R.A.A. Louviéroise players
Royal Excel Mouscron players
Ligue 1 players
Belgian Pro League players
Footballers at the 1996 Summer Olympics
Olympic footballers of France
French expatriate footballers
Expatriate footballers in Belgium
French expatriate sportspeople in Belgium